Paul Moder is an Australian actor and film maker best known for his role in starring in and producing Razor Eaters.

Education
Moder received a Bachelor of Arts in Film and Television from Swinburne University of Technology.

Career
Moder is an established figure at the Melbourne Underground Film Festival where several of his films have debuted and won awards.

In 2003, he portrayed the cop that interrogated David in Leigh Whannell's short film Saw.

In 2016, he announced plans to write and produce a film based on the events of the Port Arthur shooting that occurred in Australia in 1996. Moder said that despite not having the support of victims' families or the community of Port Arthur, he felt it was time “to examine the event in unflinching detail, free from agenda and bias”.

References

External links
 

Australian male film actors
Australian male television actors
Living people
Year of birth missing (living people)
Swinburne University of Technology alumni
20th-century Australian male actors
21st-century Australian male actors